Nyctemera ploesslo is a moth of the family Erebidae. It was described by Karel Černý in 2009 and is found in Thailand.

References

Nyctemerina
Moths described in 2009